Grangemockler / Ballyneale GAA is a Gaelic Athletic Association club located in the south-east corner of County Tipperary in Ireland. The club plays Gaelic football and hurling as part of the South division of Tipperary GAA. They have been Tipperary Senior Football Champions on eight occasions.

History
The club was founded in 1885, one year after the founding of the GAA. The club won its first ever Tipperary senior football championship title in 1890 and had to wait thirteen years before winning again in 1903 when the team won the title five years in a row in 1903, 1904, 1905, 1906 and 1907. The team was beaten the following year and the title was won by Cloneen but returned again in 1909 to take the title once more beating Clonmel Emmets in the final. It was another twenty two years before the team would win the title again in 1931.

The Tipperary county footballers that were attacked at Croke Park on Bloody Sunday of 1920 wore the Grangemockler colours. At that time the county wore the colours of its county champions, not having an official jersey. The then county champions Fethard wore blue and white but Grangemockler's white and green was worn instead. The county footballers wore a white and green commemorative jersey for the 2020 Munster Senior Football Championship final - a replica of the jersey colours worn in 1920.

Facilities
The club has played a vital part in the community with the provision of two full sized playing fields, one in Grangemockler and one in Ballyneale, a flood light training field and a sports hall, which was opened on 17 March 2009, with a kitchen, hall, and two dressing rooms.

Honours
Tipperary Senior Football Championship (8)
 1890, 1903, 1904, 1905, 1906, 1907, 1909, 1931
South Tipperary Senior Football Championship (9)
 1890, 1903, 1904, 1905, 1906, 1907, 1909, 1931, 1990 (with St. Patrick's)
Tipperary Intermediate Football Championship (2)
 1991, 2003
South Tipperary intermediate Football Championship (5)
 1990, 1991, 2002, 2014, 2022 
Tipperary Junior Football Championship (1)
 1962
South Tipperary Junior Football Championship (3) 
 1957, 1962, 1977
South Tipperary Junior B Football Championship (2) 
 2021, 2022
 Tipperary Under-21 Football Championship (1) 
 2020
 South Tipperary Under-21 A Football Championship (2) 
 1961, 2020
 Tipperary Under-21 C Football Championship (1)
 2002
 South Tipperary Under-21 C Football Championship (1)
 2002
Tipperary Minor A Football Championship (3) 
 1984 (with Moyle Rovers as Slievenamon), 1987 (with Moyle Rovers as Slievenamon) 2019
South Tipperary Minor A Football Championship (4) 
 1984 (with Moyle Rovers as Slievenamon), 1986 (with Moyle Rovers as Slievenamon), 1987 (with Moyle Rovers as Slievenamon), 2019
 South Tipperary Minor C Football Championship (2)
 2002, 2009 
Tipperary Junior A Hurling Championship (1)
 2004
South Tipperary Minor 'B' Hurling Championship(2)
 2015, 2021(u-19)
South Tipperary Under-21 'B' Hurling Championship(2)
 2016, 2019
South Tipperary Under-21 C Hurling Championship(1)
 2012

Notable players

 Michael Hogan (1896–1920) was a Gaelic footballer, and one-time Captain of the Tipperary GAA team. He was a member of the Irish Volunteers and was born in the Grangemockler area of County Tipperary. The Hogan stand in Croke Park is named in his honor. He is buried in Grangemockler church

References

External links
Official Site
GAA Info Website
Tipperary GAA site

Gaelic games clubs in County Tipperary